Sorry! is a BBC television sitcom that aired on BBC1 from 1981 to 1982 and from 1985 to 1988. It starred Ronnie Corbett and was created and written by Ian Davidson and Peter Vincent, both of whom had previously written for Corbett on The Two Ronnies.

The theme music was composed by Gaynor Colbourn and Hugh Wisdom, arranged by Gaynor Colbourn and conducted by Ronnie Hazlehurst.

Plot
Sorry! is centred on Timothy Lumsden who, 41 years old in the first three series (his age increased to 42 and then 48 in subsequent series - Corbett was actually 50-57 during the series' run), is a librarian who still lives at home with his domineering mother Phyllis and henpecked father Sidney. Although quite shy around women, Timothy longs to find love and leave home, but Phyllis is always against the idea and constantly manipulates her son into staying at home. One of the catchphrases of the series is Sidney's "Language, Timothy!", typically said in response to something that has been misunderstood as inappropriate or offensive. Timothy usually responds "Sorry, Father", but sometimes snaps "Shut up, Father!", to which Sidney replies "fair enough".

Timothy's friend Frank and sister Muriel urge Timothy to stand up to his mother once and for all. Muriel had successfully left home and married Kevin, and so is viewed with distrust by her mother.

Cast
 Ronnie Corbett – Timothy Lumsden
 Barbara Lott – Phyllis Lumsden
 William Moore – Sidney Lumsden
 Marguerite Hardiman – Muriel
 Derek Fuke – Kevin
 Roy Holder – Frank Baker
 Wendy Allnutt – Annette (series 1 ep. 1), and Jennifer (series 6)
 Bridget Brice – Pippa (series 7)
Jennie Franks - Jean
Mavis Pugh - Mrs Barrable
Sheila Fearn - Freddie
John Leeson - Victor
Michael Redfern - Denny
Teddy Green - Denzil

Barbara Lott, who played Timothy's mother, was only ten years older than Corbett.

Episodes

Series 1 (1981)

Series 2 (1982)

Series 3 (1982)

Christmas sketch (1982)

Series 4 (1985)

Series 5 (1986)

Series 6 (1987)

Series 7 (1988)

DVD releases
The first two series of Sorry! were released on DVD under Playback Entertainment (Region 2, UK) in 2004. The DVD was put out of print in 2006, but the first series was re-released on DVD in 2007 under 2entertain & BBC Worldwide. It includes three audio commentaries by Ronnie Corbett. The second series was re-released in March 2008. The third, fourth, fifth and sixth series were released (for the very first time) on 2 August 2010 and 21 February, 20 June and 26 September 2011. The seventh (and final) series was released on 4 June 2012 along with the complete set of 7 DVDs.

In region 4, the first four series have been released.

References

 Mark Lewisohn, Radio Times Guide to TV Comedy, BBC Worldwide Ltd, 2003
 British TV Comedy Guide for Sorry!

External links
 
 
 
 British Comedy Guide - Ronnie Corbett in Sorry!

1980s British sitcoms
1981 British television series debuts
1988 British television series endings
BBC television sitcoms
English-language television shows
Television series about dysfunctional families